Joshua Michael Wall (born January 21, 1987) is an American former professional baseball pitcher. He was drafted by the Los Angeles Dodgers in the 2nd round of the 2005 MLB Draft out of Central Private School in Central, Louisiana, where he was a second team High School All-American. He has played in MLB for the Dodgers and Los Angeles Angels of Anaheim.

Career

Los Angeles Dodgers
With the Dodgers organization, he played in the rookie leagues in 2005 and 2006 and spent the next four seasons (2007–2010) in Class-A with the Great Lakes Loons and Inland Empire 66ers of San Bernardino. After being used exclusively as a starting pitcher for his first six seasons in the system, in 2011 he was switched to the bullpen and promoted to the AA Chattanooga Lookouts, where he was 4–5 with a 3.93 ERA in 51 games. He was added to the 40-man roster after the season to protect him from the Rule V Draft. In 2012, he was promoted to the Triple-A Albuquerque Isotopes and was selected to the Pacific Coast League mid-season All-Star team and the post-season All-PCL team. In 55 total games with the Isotopes, he was 2–1 with a 4.53 ERA and 28 saves.

He was promoted to the Major Leagues for the first time when the Dodgers called him up on July 14, 2012. Wall made his Major League debut when he pitched a scoreless eleventh inning against the New York Mets on July 22 and picked up the win. He appeared in seven games for the Dodgers in 2012, with a  1–0 record and 4.76 ERA. He also appeared in 6 games for the Dodgers in 2013, with an ERA of 18.00. In 25 games for AAA Albuquerque in 2013 he has a 1-2 record, 5.60 ERA and 3 saves.

Miami Marlins
On July 6, 2013 he was traded to the Miami Marlins (along with Steve Ames and Ángel Sánchez) in exchange for Ricky Nolasco. He was assigned to the AAA New Orleans Zephyrs and appeared in 20 games for them, with a 3.27 ERA. He never played for the Marlins.

Los Angeles Angels of Anaheim
Wall was claimed off waivers by the Los Angeles Angels of Anaheim on October 4, 2013.

Pittsburgh Pirates
On May 22, 2014, Wall was claimed by the Pittsburgh Pirates off waivers from the Angels, and optioned to the Triple-A Indianapolis Indians. He signed a minor league contract to remain with Pittsburgh on January 30, 2015.

Chicago White Sox
On December 28, 2015, Wall signed a minor league deal with the Chicago White Sox. He was released on April 11, 2016.

Lancaster Barnstormers
On May 3, 2016, Wall signed with the Lancaster Barnstormers of the Atlantic League of Professional Baseball. Wall announced his retirement on June 29, 2016.

References

External links

1987 births
Living people
Los Angeles Dodgers players
Los Angeles Angels players
Gulf Coast Dodgers players
Ogden Raptors players
Inland Empire 66ers of San Bernardino players
Great Lakes Loons players
Chattanooga Lookouts players
Salt River Rafters players
Albuquerque Isotopes players
New Orleans Zephyrs players
Salt Lake Bees players
Major League Baseball pitchers
Indianapolis Indians players
Lancaster Barnstormers players
People from Walker, Louisiana